Phreatic is a term used in hydrology to refer to aquifers, in speleology to refer to cave passages, and in volcanology to refer to a type of volcanic eruption.

Hydrology
The term phreatic (the word originates from the Greek ,  meaning "well" or "spring") is used in hydrology and the earth sciences to refer to matters relating to ground water (an aquifer) below the water table. The term 'phreatic surface' indicates the location where the pore water pressure is under atmospheric conditions (i.e. the pressure head is zero). This surface normally coincides with the water table.  The slope of the phreatic surface is assumed to indicate the direction of ground water movement in an unconfined aquifer.  

The phreatic zone, below the phreatic surface where rock and soil is saturated with water, is the counterpart of the vadose zone, or unsaturated zone, above.  Unconfined aquifers are also referred to as phreatic aquifers because their upper boundary is provided by the phreatic surface.

Speleology
In speleogenesis, a division of speleology, 'phreatic action' forms cave passages by dissolving the limestone in all directions, as opposed to 'vadose action', whereby a stream running in a cave passage erodes a trench in the floor.    It occurs when the passage is full of water, and therefore normally only when it is below the water table, and only if the water is not saturated with calcium carbonate or calcium magnesium carbonate.  A cave passage formed in this way is characteristically circular or oval in cross-section as limestone is dissolved on all surfaces.

Many cave passages are formed by a combination of phreatic followed by vadose action. Such passages form a keyhole cross section: a round-shaped section at the top and a rectangular trench at the bottom.

Volcanology

A phreatic eruption or steam-blast eruption occurs when magma heats ground or surface water.

See also 
Phreatic zone
Vadose zone
Water content
Index: Aquifer articles

References

External links

Aquifers
Cave geology
Hydrology